Burton Island State Park is a state park in northwest Vermont, USA. The park comprises Burton Island, an island of 253 acres (1 km2) and located off St. Albans Point in Lake Champlain, close to the International Boundary with Canada. The park is administered by the Vermont Department of Forests, Parks, and Recreation, as part of the Vermont State Park system.

There are 17 tent sites and 26 lean-to sites plus 15 boat moorings and a 100-slip marina with Wi-Fi connection, dockside electricity, and a marine holding-tank pumpout facility.  Restrooms have running water and hot showers. There are 3 miles of shoreline, hiking trails, a nature center/museum, park store and food service, rowboat and canoe rentals, and places to swim and picnic.

The park is only accessible by boat. The Island Runner ferry departs from the dock in nearby Kamp Kill Kare State Park seven times daily.

Burton Island State Park is nearby other islands of Lake Champlain that are state parks, including Woods Island State Park, and Knight Island State Park. Knight Point State Park is on the nearby coast. Ball Island, a smaller island in the area, is privately owned.

References

External links
Official website

State parks of Vermont
Nature centers in Vermont
Protected areas of Franklin County, Vermont
St. Albans, Vermont
Islands of Vermont
Landforms of Franklin County, Vermont
Islands of Lake Champlain
Lake Champlain
1964 establishments in Vermont
Protected areas established in 1964